Sunset High School is a public high school in Beaverton, Oregon, United States. The school currently offers the International Baccalaureate Diploma Programme. It opened in 1959 and is the second oldest of the six high schools in the Beaverton School District. Sunset's athletic teams are known as the Apollos.

History
The school opened in January 1959, initially with freshman and sophomore students only, adding juniors in the fall and its first senior class in September 1960.

Senator Robert F. Kennedy spoke at a student-organized mock Democratic Convention held at Sunset High School on May 17, 1968, less than three weeks before his assassination on June 5.

Location

Sunset High School is located in the predominantly unincorporated area known as Cedar Mill. Although it has always had a Portland street address, it has never actually been within the city of Portland proper.  From 1959 to 1999, the school property was unincorporated land in Washington County, but in 1999 the Sunset High School grounds (including the adjacent swimming pool) were annexed by the city of Beaverton. Nevertheless, as of 2022 the school's mailing address remains a "Portland" address, as is the case for almost all of Cedar Mill.

Demographics

As of 2021–22, 50.5% of students are white, 11.4% Hispanic or Latino, 27.3% Asian, 1.3% African American, 0.4% Native Hawaiian/Pacific Islander, 0.3% American Indian/Alaska Native, and 8.6% two or more races. The 2021–22 enrollment was 2,003.

Academics
In 1983, Sunset High School was honored in the Blue Ribbon Schools Program, the highest honor a school can receive in the United States.

In 2008, 84% of the school's seniors received a high school diploma. Of 498 students, 409 graduated, 59 dropped out, five received a modified diploma, and 25 were still in high school in 2009.

State titles 

State championships (Oregon School Activities Association) won by Sunset High School:
 Football: 1975, 1976
 Basketball (boys): 1975, 1987
 Baseball: 1965, 1994
 Cross country (boys): 1980, 1982, 1984
 Cross country (girls): 1976, 1984, 1988, 1989, 2013, 2015
 Dance/Drill: 2014
 Golf (boys): 1986, 1990, 1993, 1994
Speech and Debate: 2021
 Soccer (boys): 1985 (tie)
 Soccer (girls): 1990
 Swimming (boys): 1965, 2011, 2012, 2013, 2014
 Swimming (girls): 1983, 1984, 1985, 1994, 2017, 2018
 Track and field (boys): 1994, 2011
 Track and field (girls): 1977, 1978
 Tennis (boys): 1972, 1977, 1981, 1982
 Tennis (girls): 1978, 1979, 1980, 1981, 1982, 1983, 1987, 1990, 2019

Notable alumni

 Brenda Bakke, actress
 Brady Clark, Major League Baseball player
 Caspar Corbeau, Dutch-American swimmer
 Tom Drougas, professional American football coach and former player
 Andrew Gregor, former professional soccer player
 Stephanie Kaza, professor emeritus of environment and natural resources
 Phil Keisling, Oregon Secretary of State
 Patrick Lachman, heavy metal guitarist and vocalist
 Susan M. Leeson, attorney and former judge
 Landen Lucas, professional basketball player
 Drew Martin, collegiate and professional basketball player
 Patrick O'Hearn, musician, composer
 E. Werner Reschke, businessman and politician
 Joe Sacco, comics artist and journalist
 Katee Sackhoff, actress
 Garrett Sim, basketball player
 Royal Skousen, professor of linguistics and English
 Randall Sullivan, author and journalist
 Courtney Taylor, singer-songwriter
 Tommy Thayer, rock guitarist, KISS
 Aaron Woods, professional football player

References

External links 

 
 

Education in Beaverton, Oregon
High schools in Washington County, Oregon
International Baccalaureate schools in Oregon
Educational institutions established in 1959
Buildings and structures in Beaverton, Oregon
Public high schools in Oregon
1959 establishments in Oregon
Beaverton School District
Cedar Mill, Oregon